The Rural Municipality of Canwood No. 494 is a rural municipality (RM) in the Canadian province of Saskatchewan within Census Division No. 16 and  Division No. 5. The RM is located in the north-central portion of the province, west of the City of Prince Albert.

History 
The RM of Thompson No. 494 was originally incorporated as a rural municipality on January 1, 1913. Its name was changed to the RM of Canwood No. 494 on April 29, 1916.

Geography 
The RM is bordered to the north by the RM of Big River No. 555, to the northeast by Prince Albert National Park, to the west by the RM of Spiritwood No. 496, to the south by the RM of Leask No. 464, and to the east by the RM of Shellbrook No. 493.

Communities and localities 
The following urban municipalities are surrounded by the RM.

Towns
Canwood

Villages
Debden

The following unincorporated communities are within the RM.

Localities
Hawkeye
Mont Nebo
Ordale
Pebble Baye
Stump Lake
Victoire
Wrixen

The RM completely and partially surrounds the First Nation reserves of Ahtahkakoop No. 104 and Mistawasis No. 183 respectively.

Canwood Regional Park 
Initial development of the park began in 1959 and, in 1961, it became a regional park. The park has a golf course, a campground, picnic area, ball diamonds, and hiking trails.

The campground has 20 electrified campsites, potable water, and a washroom and shower facility. The campground is central to the other amenities of the park.

Canwood Regional Park Golf Club is a 9-hole, grass greens golf course with a clubhouse, which is open daily for concession and meals, a pro shop, and two tees per hole. It is a par 35 course with white tees totalling 2,885 yards and red tees totalling 2,625.

Demographics 

Transportation 
Rail
The Canwood RM area is currently serviced by the Carlton Trail Railway, a shortline of the Canadian National Railway.

Roads
Highway 793—serves Debden and Victoire
Highway 55—serves Debden, Polwarth and Canwood
Highway 694—intersects Highway 55 south of Polwarth

Government 
The RM of Canwood No. 494 is governed by an elected municipal council and an appointed administrator that meets on the third Tuesday of every month. The reeve of the RM is Lyndon Pease while its administrator is Lorna Benson. The RM's office is located in Canwood.

See also 
List of rural municipalities in Saskatchewan

References 

C

Division No. 16, Saskatchewan